Search Engine Watch (SEW) provides news and information about search engines and search engine marketing.

Search Engine Watch was started by Danny Sullivan in 1996. In 1997, Sullivan sold it for an undisclosed amount to Mecklermedia (now WebMediaBrands). In 2005 the website and related Search Engine Strategies conference series were sold to Incisive Media for $43 million. On November 30, 2006, Danny Sullivan left Search Engine Watch, after his resignation announcement on August 29, 2006. Rebecca Lieb was named editor-in-chief the following month.

In 2015, Incisive Media sold SES, Search Engine Watch, and ClickZ to Blenheim Chalcot.

Google's Matt Cutts has called Search Engine Watch "a must read." Yahoo's Tim Mayer has said that it is the "most authoritative source on search."

See also
 List of search engines
 Pay per click

References

External links

Internet search engines
American technology news websites